State Department: File 649 is a 1949 film noir Cinecolor American film directed by Sam Newfield (using the pseudonym "Peter Stewart").

The film is also known as Assignment in China in the United Kingdom.

Plot summary 
Kenneth Seeley (William Lundigan), member of the U. S. State Department's Foreign Service Bureau, and Marge Weldon (Virginia Bruce ), a morale worker with the bureau, are assigned to an area in Mongolia dominated by an outlaw warlord. The latter captures the village where they reside and they'll have to make a plan to escape.

Cast

Production
Filming started 15 September at Nassour Studios.

External links

References

1949 films
1949 drama films
1940s spy drama films
American spy drama films
1940s English-language films
Cold War spy films
Films set in Mongolia
Films set in China
Cinecolor films
Films directed by Sam Newfield
1940s American films